The marmosets, also known as zaris or sagoin, are 22 New World monkey species of the genera Callithrix, Cebuella, Callibella, and Mico. All four genera are part of the biological family Callitrichidae. The term "marmoset" is also used in reference to Goeldi's marmoset, Callimico goeldii, which is closely related.

Relative to other monkeys, they show some apparently primitive features; they have claws rather than nails, and tactile hairs on their wrists. They lack wisdom teeth, and their brain layout seems to be relatively primitive. Their body temperature is unusually variable, changing by up to 4°C (7°F) in a day. Marmosets are native to South America and have been found in Bolivia, Brazil, Colombia, Ecuador, Paraguay, and Peru. They have also been occasionally spotted in Central America and southern Mexico. They are sometimes kept as pets, though they have specific dietary and habitat needs that require consideration.

According to recent research, marmosets exhibit germline chimerism, which is not known to occur in nature in any primates other than callitrichids. 95% of marmoset fraternal twins trade blood through chorionic fusions, making them hematopoietic chimeras.

Etymology
Callithrix comes from Ancient Greek and means "beautiful fur".

Species list
 Genus Callithrix—Atlantic marmosets
 Common marmoset, Callithrix jacchus
 Black-tufted marmoset, Callithrix penicillata
 Wied's marmoset, Callithrix kuhlii
 White-headed marmoset, Callithrix geoffroyi
 Buffy-headed marmoset, Callithrix flaviceps
 Buffy-tufted marmoset, Callithrix aurita
 Genus Mico—Amazonian marmosets
 Rio Acari marmoset, Mico acariensis
 Silvery marmoset, Mico argentatus
 White marmoset, Mico leucippe
 Emilia's marmoset, Mico emiliae
 Black-headed marmoset, Mico nigriceps
 Marca's marmoset, Mico marcai
 Black-tailed marmoset, Mico melanura
 Santarem marmoset, Mico humeralifer
 Maués marmoset, Mico mauesi
 Munduruku marmoset, Mico munduruku
 Gold-and-white marmoset, Mico chrysoleucos
 Hershkovitz's marmoset, Mico intermedius
 Satéré marmoset, Mico saterei
 Rondon's marmoset, Mico rondoni
 Genus Callibella—Roosmalens' dwarf marmoset
 Roosmalens' dwarf marmoset, Callibella humilis
 Genus Cebuella—Pygmy Marmoset
 Pygmy marmoset, Cebuella pygmaea

Behavior

Marmosets are highly active, living in the upper canopy of forest trees, and feeding on insects, fruit, leaves, tack, sap, and gum. They have long lower incisors, which allow them to chew holes in tree trunks and branches to harvest the gum inside; some species are specialised feeders on gum.

Marmosets live in family groups of three to 15, consisting of one or two breeding females, an unrelated male, their offspring, and occasionally extended family members and unrelated individuals. Their mating systems are highly variable and can include monogamy, polygyny, and polyandry. In most species, fraternal twins are usually born, but triplets are not unknown. Like other callitrichines, marmosets are characterized by a high degree of cooperative care of the young and some food sharing and tolerated theft. Adult males, females other than the mother, and older offspring participate in carrying infants. Father marmosets are an exceptionally attentive example of fathers within the animal kingdom, going as far as assisting their mates in giving birth, cleaning up afterbirth, and even biting the umbilical cords attaching their newborn offspring to their mothers. Most groups scent mark and defend the edges of their ranges, but  if they are truly territorial is unclear, as group home ranges greatly overlap.

The favorite food of marmosets is carbohydrate-rich tree sap, which they reach by gnawing holes in trunks. Their territories are centered on the trees that they regularly exploit in this way. The smaller marmosets venture into the very top of forest canopies to hunt insects that are abundant there.

References

External links
 Primate Info Net Callithrix Factsheets
 Common Marmoset Care

^
Marmosets
^
Mammal common names